Sangita Iyer is an Indian-born Canadian author, broadcast journalist, writer, biologist and documentary filmmaker. She is known for her advocacy on wildlife conservation, especially for wild elephants, and for exposing the atrocities against Asian elephants by religious institutions. Iyer has been featured in the BBC News. She is the founding executive director and president of the Voice for Asian Elephants Society, which was created in 2016 with the aim of protecting wild and captive elephants of India.

Iyer's debut documentary film, Gods in Shackles, was based on the treatment of captive elephants in Kerala. The film was nominated at the United Nations General Assembly, featured at the International Film Festival of India (IFFI) and has received over a dozen international film festival awards. The documentary was inspired by the encounters and witnesses gathered by Iyer. Here recently released book, Gods in Shackles - What Elephants Can Teach us About Empathy, Resilience and Freedom ranked the #1 Best Seller list on Amazon, since its release on February 8, 2022. She is also a National Geographic explorer, and has produced a 26-part short documentary series about Asian elephants, using the National Geographic Society storytelling award.

Biography 
Sangita Iyer was born in Kerala, India. She has worked in Kenya, where she taught biology and ecology to Nairobi high school students in the early 1980s, and in Bermuda as the primetime news anchor and nature and wildlife reporter for the ABC/CBS affiliate, the Bermuda Broadcasting Company. She currently lives in Toronto, Canada, where she has served as a videographer and host for Rogers TV network.

Career 
Iyer pursued her career in journalism in 1999 as a health and environmental journalist. She completed her MA degree in environmental education and communication in 2012. She produced reports related to nature and wildlife for Discovery Channel science-news programme Daily Planet. She co-founded the Bermuda Environmental Alliance in 2009 and she founded the Voice for Asian Elephants Society in 2016.

In 2013, Iyer began to document the elephants in Kerala that are exploited by religious institutions, and created the documentary film Gods in Shackles (2016) which portrays the suffering faced by the temple elephants during cultural festivals. She decided to make the film after witnessing the torture faced by the elephants during a trip to India in December 2013. The documentary opened to positive reviews from critics and won international awards. Iyer is the first woman to have made a documentary about captive elephants in Kerala.

Iyer received the 2016 Nari Shakti Puraskar award from the then Indian President Pranab Mukherjee. In addition, Iyer has received numerous academic awards and scholarships.

Controversies 
In November 2019, a petition was filed by Viswa Gaja Seva Samithi organisation in the Kerala High Court to prevent Iyer from conducting a mahout (elephant care) training summit called "Gentle Giants Summit" at a government-owned elephant rehabilitation centre in Thiruvananthapuram. The plea claimed that she was a foreign national in contrast to the national policies and was also accused of misusing the official emblem of Kerala state government in the brochures for the three-day workshop. However, Iyer presented her Overseas Citizenship of India (OCI) card, affording her the privileges of Indian citizens, and the Kerala Forest Department had granted her the use of its emblem in their partnership on the summit.

Iyer stated that she had been a victim of cyberbullying since the release of Gods in Shackles.

See also 

 List of people from Kerala

References

External links 
 

Living people
Canadian environmentalists
Canadian women journalists
21st-century Canadian women writers
Canadian documentary film directors
Canadian women biologists
Indian activists
Indian women journalists
Indian documentary film directors
Indian women biologists
Indian emigrants to Canada
21st-century Indian women writers
21st-century Indian writers
People from Kerala
Year of birth missing (living people)
21st-century Canadian non-fiction writers
Canadian women non-fiction writers
Canadian women film directors
Canadian documentary film producers
Canadian women film producers
21st-century Canadian biologists
21st-century Canadian women scientists
Asian-Canadian filmmakers
Canadian women documentary filmmakers